Senator Sinner may refer to:

George A. Sinner (1928–2018), North Dakota State Senate
George B. Sinner (fl. 2010s), North Dakota State Senate